Drosanthemum schoenlandianum is a species of succulent plant in the genus Drosanthemum. It is endemic to the Cape Provinces of South Africa.

Conservation status 
Drosanthemum schoenlandianum is classified as Least Concern as the population trend is stable.

References

External links 
 

Endemic flora of South Africa
Flora of South Africa
Flora of Southern Africa
Flora of the Cape Provinces
schoenlandianum